Costa da Caparica Fossil Cliff Protected Landscape is a protected landscape in Portugal. It is one of the 30 areas which are officially under protection in the country.

Protected landscapes of Portugal
Geography of Setúbal District
Tourist attractions in Setúbal District